La Mesa prison is a penitentiary in Tijuana, Baja California, Mexico, near the Mexico–United States border. It is located in the La Mesa section of the city.

Sister Antonia Brenner, a Catholic nun, lived with the inmates of La Mesa Prison for over thirty years, and was called "La mama" or the "Prison Angel."

Famous Mexican musician Chalino Sanchez spent some time in this prison in 1984 on human smuggling charges. It is said that this is where his musical journey began. He began to compose songs for his fellow inmates and anyone that had a story worth telling.

September 2008 riots
In September 2008, there were two riots. The September 13 riot, in which three inmates were killed, was caused by upset over the death of an inmate in a prison search for drugs and weapons. The September 18 riot, which killed 19 and injured 12, was caused by frustration of the inmates not being given any water since the first riot.

References

Prisons in Mexico
Buildings and structures in Tijuana
2008 riots
2008 in Mexico
Prison uprisings in Mexico
History of Baja California